Muzik 247 based out of Chennai, acquires music rights for South Indian Cinema films, mainly Tamil, Malayalam and Tulu. The company was founded in 2012 by Naveen Bhandari, and has achieved a large market share of the Malayalam film music.

About
The company distributes the acquired content on various web and Mobile platforms, including iTunes, Apple Music, Spotify, JioSaavn, Gaana, Wynk Music, YouTube, Book My show Jukebox, and Amazon Music.  Muzik247, in an attempt to promote young music talent, launched 'Muzik247 Music Maker 2015' - a talent hunt to bring out the next Malayalam music sensation In December 2015, Starting in September 2016, Muzik247 also began acquiring short films to keep their audience engaged with another form of entertainment.

Muzik247 won the title of the Best Malayalam Music label at Indywood Music Excellence Awards 2017 - Kerala Chapter

In July 2018, Muzik247 crossed 1 million subscribers on its official YouTube channel and also was awarded by YouTube for it with a gold badge.

Notable releases
In the year 2015, Muzik247 acquired the music of Director Alphonse Puthren's movie Premam.

A Muzik247 acquired album, Charlie created a record of having more than one lakh views on the album uploaded on YouTube within a day of its release. The album was released on Muzik247's official YouTube page. 

In Nov 2016, Poomaram song video from Poomaram, on Muzik247 started trending within the first ten positions on YouTube India. The video reached a milestone by crossing 10 million views on YouTube and being the most Liked Malayalam video on YouTube.

"Manikya Malaraya Poovi", the song from Oru Adaar Love has become the fastest video from South India to cross 50 Million views on YouTube.

In September 2018, "Freak Penne" from Oru Adaar Love composed by Shaan Rahman, crossed 1 million views on Muzik247's channel in less than 10 hours.

Film music released by Muzik247

Following are the list of notable music albums Released by Muzik 247.

Music Albums Produced by Muzik247
Following are the list of notable music albums by Muzik247.

Short films
Following are the list of notable short films by Muzik247.

References

External links 
 Company website

Indian record labels
Indian companies established in 2012
Indian music record labels